The Lockheed Martin Corporation is an American aerospace, arms, defense, information security, and technology corporation with worldwide interests. It was formed by the merger of Lockheed Corporation with Martin Marietta in March 1995. It is headquartered in North Bethesda, Maryland, in the Washington, D.C. area. Lockheed Martin employs approximately 115,000 employees worldwide, including about 60,000 engineers and scientists as of January 2022.

Lockheed Martin is one of the largest companies in the aerospace, military support, security, and technologies industry. It is the world's largest defense contractor by revenue for fiscal year 2014. In 2013, 78% of Lockheed Martin's revenues came from military sales; it topped the list of US federal government contractors and received nearly 10% of the funds paid out by the Pentagon. In 2009, US government contracts accounted for $38.4 billion (85%), foreign government contracts for $5.8 billion (13%), and commercial and other contracts for $900 million (2%).

Half of the corporation’s annual sales are to the U.S. Department of Defense. Lockheed Martin is also a contractor for the U.S. Department of Energy and the National Aeronautics and Space Administration (NASA).

Lockheed Martin operates in four business segments: Aeronautics, Missiles and Fire Control (MFC), Rotary and Mission Systems (RMS), and Space. The company has received the Collier Trophy six times, including in 2001 for being part of developing the X-35/F-35B LiftFan Propulsion System and most recently in 2018 for the Automatic Ground Collision Avoidance System (Auto-GCAS). Lockheed Martin is currently developing the F-35 Lightning II and leads the international supply chain, leads the team for the development and implementation of technology solutions for the new USAF Space Fence (AFSSS replacement), and is the primary contractor for the development of the Orion command module. The company also invests in healthcare systems, renewable energy systems, intelligent energy distribution, and compact nuclear fusion.

History

1990s
Merger talks between Lockheed Corporation and Martin Marietta began in March 1994, with the companies announcing their $10 billion planned merger on August 30, 1994. The headquarters for the combined companies would be at Martin Marietta headquarters in North Bethesda, Maryland. The deal was finalized on March 15, 1995, when the two companies' shareholders approved the merger.  The segments of the two companies not retained by the new company formed the basis for L-3 Communications, a mid-size defense contractor in its own right. Lockheed Martin also later spun off the materials company Martin Marietta Materials.

The company's executives received large bonuses directly from the government as a result of the merger. Norman R. Augustine who was at the time CEO of Martin Marietta received an $8.2 million bonus.

Both companies contributed important products to the new portfolio. Lockheed products included the Trident missile, P-3 Orion maritime patrol aircraft, U-2 and SR-71 Blackbird reconnaissance airplanes, F-117 Nighthawk, F-16 Fighting Falcon, F-22 Raptor, C-130 Hercules, A-4AR Fightinghawk and the DSCS-3 satellite. Martin Marietta products included Titan rockets, Sandia National Laboratories (management contract acquired in 1993), Space Shuttle External Tank, Viking 1 and Viking 2 landers, the Transfer Orbit Stage (under subcontract to Orbital Sciences Corporation) and various satellite models.

On April 22, 1996, Lockheed Martin completed the acquisition of Loral Corporation's defense electronics and system integration businesses for $9.1 billion, the deal having been announced in January. The remainder of Loral became Loral Space & Communications.  Lockheed Martin abandoned plans for an $8.3 billion merger with Northrop Grumman on July 16, 1998, due to government concerns over the potential strength of the new group; Lockheed/Northrop would have had control of 25% of the Department of Defense's procurement budget.

For the Mars Climate Orbiter, Lockheed Martin incorrectly provided NASA with software using measurements in US Customary force units when metric units were expected; this resulted in the loss of the Orbiter at a cost of $125 million.  The development of the spacecraft cost $193 million.

In addition to their military products, in the 1990s Lockheed Martin developed the texture mapping chip for the Sega Model 2 arcade system board and the entire graphics system for the Sega Model 3, which were used to power some of the most popular arcade games of the time.

2000s

In May 2001, Lockheed Martin sold Lockheed Martin Control Systems to BAE Systems. On November 27, 2000, Lockheed completed the sale of its Aerospace Electronic Systems business to BAE Systems for $1.67 billion, a deal announced in July 2000. This group encompassed Sanders Associates, Fairchild Systems, and Lockheed Martin Space Electronics & Communications. In 2001, Lockheed Martin won the contract to build the F-35 Lightning II; this was the largest fighter aircraft procurement project since the F-16, with an initial order of 3,000 aircraft. In 2001, Lockheed Martin settled a nine–year investigation conducted by NASA's Office of Inspector General with the assistance of the Defense Contract Audit Agency. The company paid the United States government $7.1 million based on allegations that its predecessor, Lockheed Engineering Science Corporation, submitted false lease costs claims to NASA.

On May 12, 2006, The Washington Post reported that when Robert Stevens took control of Lockheed Martin in 2004, he faced the dilemma that within 10 years, 100,000 of the about 130,000 Lockheed Martin employees – more than three-quarters – would be retiring. On August 31, 2006, Lockheed Martin won a $3.9 billion contract from NASA to design and build the CEV capsule, later named Orion for the Ares I rocket in the Constellation Program. In 2009, NASA reduced the capsule crew requirements from the initial six seats to four for transport to the International Space Station.

In August 2007, Lockheed Martin acquired 3Dsolve, a Cary, North Carolina, company that created simulations and training modules for the military and corporate clients. Renamed Lockheed Martin 3D Learning Systems, the company remained in Cary with 3D's founder founder Richard Boyd as director. The name was eventually shortened to Lockheed Martin 3D Solutions.

On August 13, 2008, Lockheed Martin acquired the government business unit of Nantero, Inc., a company that had developed methods and processes for incorporating carbon nanotubes in next-generation electronic devices.  In 2009, Lockheed Martin bought Unitech.

2010s
On November 18, 2010, Lockheed Martin announced that it would be closing its Eagan, Minnesota, location by 2013 to reduce costs and optimize capacity at its locations nationwide. In January 2011, Lockheed Martin agreed to pay the US Government $2 million to settle allegations that the company submitted false claims on a U.S. government contract for that amount. The allegations came from a contract with the Naval Oceanographic Office Major Shared Resource Center in Mississippi. On May 25, 2011, Lockheed Martin bought the first Quantum Computing System from D-Wave Systems. Lockheed Martin and D-Wave will collaborate to realize the benefits of a computing platform based upon a quantum annealing processor, as applied to some of Lockheed Martin's most challenging computation problems. Lockheed Martin established a multi-year contract that includes one system, maintenance and services. Potentially an important milestone for both companies.

On May 28, 2011, it was reported that a cyberattack using previously stolen EMC files had broken through to sensitive materials at the contractor.  It is unclear if the Lockheed incident is the specific prompt whereby on June 1, 2011, the new United States military strategy, makes explicit that a cyberattack is casus belli for a traditional act of war.

On July 10, 2012, Lockheed Martin announced it was cutting its workforce by 740 workers to reduce costs and remain competitive as necessary for future growth. On November 27, 2012, Lockheed Martin announced that Marillyn Hewson will become the corporation's chief executive officer on January 1, 2013.

On January 7, 2013, Lockheed Martin Canada announced that it will be acquiring the engine maintenance, repair and overhaul assets from Aveos Fleet Performance in Montreal, Quebec, Canada. On July 3, 2013, Lockheed Martin announced that it was partnering with DreamHammer to use the company's software for integrated command and control of its unmanned aerial vehicles. Lockheed Martin teamed up with Bell Helicopter to propose the V-280 Valor tiltrotor for the Future Vertical Lift (FVL) program. In September 2013, Lockheed Martin acquired the Scotland-based tech firm, Amor Group, saying the deal would aid its plans to expand internationally and into non-defense markets. On November 14, 2013, Lockheed announced they would be closing their Akron, Ohio facility laying off 500 employees and transferring other employees to other locations.

In March 2014, Lockheed Martin acquired Beontra AG, a provider of integrated planning and demand forecasting tools for airport, planning to expand their business in commercial airport information technology solutions. Also in March 2014, Lockheed Martin announced its acquisition of Industrial Defender Inc. On June 2, 2014, Lockheed Martin received a Pentagon contract to build a space fence that would track debris, keeping it from damaging satellites and spacecraft.

On July 20, 2015, Lockheed Martin announced plans to purchase Sikorsky Aircraft from United Technologies Corporation at a cost of $7.1 billion. The Pentagon has criticized the acquisition as causing a reduction in competition. In November 2015, the acquisition received final approval from the Chinese government, with a total cost of $9 billion. Dan Schulz was named the president of Lockheed Martin's Sikorsky company. Lockheed Martin has shown sketches for a twin-engine, blended wing body strategic airlifter similar in size to the C-5. On March 31, 2015, the US Navy awarded Lockheed Martin a contract worth $362 million for construction of Freedom-class ship LCS 21 and $79 million for advance procurement for LCS 23. The Freedom-class ships are built by Fincantieri Marinette Marine in Marinette, Wisconsin. In December 2015, Lockheed won an $867 million seven-year contract to train Australia’s next generation of military pilots. There is also an option in the deal to extend this contract across 26 years which would greatly increase the deal’s value.

In August 2016, Canadian Forces Maritime tested an integrated submarine combat system developed by Lockheed Martin. The test marked Canada’s first use of the combat system with the MK 48 heavyweight torpedo, variant 7AT. The same month, a deal to merge Leidos with the entirety of Lockheed Martin's Information Systems & Global Solutions (IS&GS) business came to a close.

In May 2017, during a visit to Saudi Arabia by President Donald Trump, Saudi Arabia signed business deals worth tens of billions of dollars with U.S. companies, including Lockheed Martin. (See: 2017 United States–Saudi Arabia arms deal)

On August 13, 2018, Lockheed Martin announced that the company had secured a $480 million contract from the United States Air Force to develop a hypersonic weapon prototype. A hypersonic missile can travel at one mile a second. This is the second contract for hypersonic weapons that Martin has secured; The first was from the Air Force as well and for $928 million which was announced in April 2018.

On November 29, 2018, Lockheed Martin was awarded a Commercial Lunar Payload Services contract by NASA, which makes it eligible to bid on delivering science and technology payloads to the Moon for NASA, worth $2.6 billion. Lockheed Martin plans to formally propose a lander called McCandless Lunar Lander, named after the late astronaut and former Lockheed Martin employee Bruce McCandless II, who in 1984 performed the first free-flying spacewalk without a lifeline to the orbiting shuttle, using a jetpack built by the company. This lander would be based on the successful design of the Phoenix and InSight Mars landers.

On April 11, 2019, at 6:35 pm EDT, an Arabsat-6A satellite was successfully launched from (LC-39A). This satellite is one of two, the other being SaudiGeoSat-1/HellasSat-4 and they are the "most advanced commercial communications satellites ever built by" Lockheed Martin.

On September 23, 2019, Lockheed Martin and NASA signed a $4.6-billion contract to build six or more Orion capsules for NASA's Artemis program to send astronauts to the Moon.

2020s
In January 2020, the Naval Sea Systems Command awarded Lockheed Martin with a $138 million contract related with the AEGIS Combat System Engineering Agent (CSEA). The LMT Rotary and Mission Systems (RMS) unit of the company is to develop, integrate, test, and deliver the AEGIS Advanced Capability Build (ACB) 20 integrated combat system. Martin will work on the AEGIS in New Jersey. The project is expected to be completed by December 2020.

In January 2020, the Pentagon found at least 800 software defects in Lockheed Martin's F-35 fighter jets owned by the US Armed Forces during an annual review. The 2018 and 2019 reviews revealed a large number of defects as well.

In February 2020, Lockheed Martin acquired Vector Launch Inc's satellite software technology GalacticSky for $4.25 million after a bankruptcy court received no bids by the February 21 deadline.

On December 20, 2020, it was announced that Lockheed Martin would acquire Aerojet Rocketdyne Holdings for $4.4 billion. The acquisition was expected to close in first quarter of 2022. On February 13, 2022, Lockheed abandoned the deal following regulatory disapproval.

Finances 
For the fiscal year 2020, Lockheed Martin reported earnings of $6.833 billion, with an annual revenue of $65.398 billion, an increase of 9.3% over the previous year. Backlog was 144.0 billion at the end of 2019, up from 130.5 billion at the end of the 2018.  Firm orders were $94.5 billion at the end of 2019. Its shares traded at over $389 per share.  Its market capitalization was valued at US$109.83 billion at the end of 2019.  Lockheed Martin ranked No. 60 in the 2019 Fortune 500 list of the largest United States corporations by total revenue (down from No. 59 in 2018).

Carbon footprint
Lockheed Martin Corporation reported Total CO2e emissions (Direct + Indirect) for the twelve months ending 31 December 2020 at 919 Kt (-49 /-5.1% y-o-y).

Government contracts
Lockheed Martin received $36 billion in government contracts in 2008 alone; more than any company in history. It does work for more than two dozen government agencies from the Department of Defense and the Department of Energy to the Department of Agriculture and the Environmental Protection Agency. It is involved in surveillance and information processing for the CIA, the FBI, the Internal Revenue Service (IRS), the National Security Agency (NSA), The Pentagon, the Census Bureau, and the Postal Service.

In October 2013, Lockheed announced it expected to finalize a $2.2 billion contract with the United States Air Force for two advanced military communications satellites.

Lockheed Martin has already begun to help the military transition to renewable energy sources with solar photovoltaic powered microgrids and as the military aims to reach 25% renewable energy by 2025 in order to improve national security.

Corruption investigations
On March 3, 2012, the U.S. Justice Department said that Lockheed Martin had agreed to settle allegations that the defense contractor had sold overpriced perishable tools used on many contracts. The DoJ said the allegations were based specifically on the subsidiary Tools & Metals Inc's inflation of costs between 1998 and 2005, which Lockheed Martin then passed on to the U.S. government under its contracts. Further, in March 2006, Todd B. Loftis, a former TMI president, was sentenced to 87 months in prison and ordered to pay a fine of $20 million following his guilty plea.

On February 20, 2013, Lockheed Martin Corp complied with the U.S. District Court in New York, agreeing to pay a $19.5 million lawsuit to conclude a securities fraud class-action legal battle that had accused the company of deceiving shareholders in regards to expectations for the company's information technology division.

On December 20, 2014, Lockheed Martin Integrated Systems agreed to settle a False Claims Act lawsuit paying $27.5 million to finalize allegations that it had knowingly overbilled taxpayers for work performed by company staff who did not hold the relevant essential qualifications for the contract.

Organization

Advanced design and development division
 Skunk Works

Aeronautics

 Lockheed Martin Aeronautics

Missiles and Fire Control
 Lockheed Martin Missiles and Fire Control

Rotary and Mission Systems
 Lockheed Martin Rotary and Mission Systems (formerly Mission Systems and Sensors, and then Mission Systems & Training)
 Sikorsky Aircraft

Space
 Lockheed Martin Space Systems

Others
 Lockheed Martin Canada
 Lockheed Martin Australia
 Lockheed Martin Advanced Technology Laboratories
 LMC Properties
 Lockheed Martin Enterprise Business Services
 Lockheed Martin Finance Corporation
 Lockheed Martin U.K.
 SIM Industries – a Lockheed Martin company

Joint ventures
 International Launch Services (with Khrunichev, RSC Energia)
 Lockheed Martin Alenia Tactical Transport Systems (with Alenia Aeronautica), now folded
 MEADS International (with EADS and MBDA)
 Space Imaging (46%, remainder public)
 United Launch Alliance (with Boeing)
 Javelin Joint Venture (with Raytheon)
 Longbow LLC (with Northrop Grumman)
 United Space Alliance (with Boeing)
 Kelly Aviation Center (with GE and Rolls-Royce)
 Protector USV – an unmanned surface vehicle (with Rafael Advanced Defense Systems and BAE Systems)
 Defense Support Services (DS2) with Day & Zimmermann
 Tata Lockheed Martin Aerostructures Limited (with Indian company Tata Advanced Systems Limited)
 Advanced Military Maintenance Repair and Overhaul Center (AMMROC) (with Mubadala Development Company)

Divested
 Pacific Architects and Engineers (PAE) Holding, Inc

Corporate governance

Board of directors
The board of directors consists of 14 members. As of February 2016, members include:
 Daniel Akerson (since 2014)
 David Burritt (since 2008)
 Bruce Carlson (since 2015)
 Joseph F. Dunford (since 2020)
 James Ellis (since 2004)
 Thomas Falk (since 2010)
 Ilene S. Gordon (since 2016)
 Marillyn Hewson
 Vicki A. Hollub (since 2018)
 Jeh Johnson (since 2018)
 Debra L. Reed-Klages (since 2019)
 James D. Taiclet (since 2018)

Chief executive officer
 Daniel Tellep (1995–1996)
 Norman Augustine (1996–1997)
 Vance Coffman (1997–2004)
 Robert J. Stevens (2004–2012)
 Marillyn Hewson (2013–2020)
 James Taiclet (2020–present)

Chairman of the board
 Robert J. Stevens (2005–2013)
 Marillyn Hewson (2014–)

Ownership
As of March 2020, Lockheed Martin shares are mainly held by institutional investors (State Street Corporation, Vanguard group, BlackRock, Capital Group Companies, and others).

Criticism
Lockheed Martin is listed as the largest U.S. government contractor and ranks first for the number of incidents, and fifth for the size of settlements on the 'contractor misconduct' database maintained by the Project on Government Oversight, a Washington, D.C.-based watchdog group. Since 1995, the company has agreed to pay $676.8 million to settle 88 instances of misconduct.

In 2013, Lt. Gen. Christopher Bogdan criticized the company's F-35 fighter program. The general said: "I want them both to start behaving like they want to be around for 40 years ... I want them to take on some of the risk of this program. I want them to invest in cost reductions. I want them to do the things that will build a better relationship. I'm not getting all that love yet." The criticism came in the wake of previous criticism from former Defense Secretary Robert Gates regarding the same program.

Lobbying
According to the magazine Politico, Lockheed Martin has "a political network that is already the envy of its competitors", and its contracts enjoy wide bipartisan support in the U.S. Congress thanks to it having "perfected the strategy of spreading jobs on weapons programs in key states and congressional districts". The company's 2010 lobbying expenditure by the third quarter was $9.9 million (2009 total: $13.7 million).

Through its political action committee (PAC), the company provides low levels of financial support to candidates who advocate national defense and relevant business issues. It was the largest contributor to the House Armed Services Committee chairman, Republican Buck McKeon of California with over $50,000 donated in the election cycle as of January 2011. It also was the top donor to Sen. Daniel Inouye (D-HI), the chair of the Senate Appropriations Committee before his death in 2012.

Lockheed Martin Employees Political Action Committee is one of the 50 largest in the country, according to FEC data. With contributions from 3,000 employees, it donates $500,000 a year to about 260 House and Senate candidates.

Management 
Senior management consists of the CEO, CFO, and Executive Vice Presidents (EVPs) of four business areas. The EVPs are responsible for managing major programs.

On March 16, 2020, Lockheed announced that CEO Marillyn Hewson would become executive chair and be succeeded as CEO by James Taiclet on June 15; Taiclet was at the time the head of American Tower, and had previously been the president of Honeywell Aerospace and before that a VP at United Technologies. Lockheed also announced that it would create the chief operating officer role, to which current EVP Frank A. St John would be promoted.

Employees in each program are organized into four tiers: Tier1 –Program Manager/VP, Tier2-Functional Teams (Finance, Chief Engineer, Quality, Operations, etc.), Tier3-Integrated Product Teams (IPTs) (Weapon System Development, Weapon System Integration, etc.), and Tier4-detailed product development.  Floor or touch workers belong to component assembly teams. Lockheed Martin manages and maintains its relationship with these touch workers through its supervisors and unions.

Lockheed Martin manages employees through its Full Spectrum Leadership and LM21 programs. The LM21 program relies on Six Sigma principles, which are techniques to improve efficiency. Senior management constructs leadership councils and assigns managers to facilitate Kaizen events, which target specific processes for improvement.  A manager facilitates teams and processes stakeholders and suppliers to streamline process implementation.

Tier2 Functional Leads and Tier3 IPT Leads report to Tier1. IPT leads are responsible for entire systems or products defined by the contract's Statement of Work.

To control quality, Lockheed Martin trains and builds IPT teams. and ensures that work is executed correctly through a Technical Performance Measure (TPM) system which emphasizes its Lean and 6 Sigma processes. Middle management uses commitment mechanisms that parallel high commitment and human relations theory.

Floor employees assemble aircraft using Flow-to-takt lean manufacturing process which uses properties from both division of labor and scientific management. By separating tasks based on parts, Lockheed Martin utilizes the division of labor theory, specialization on a specific area creates efficiency.

Double Helix methodology
The "Double Helix methodology" is a systems development methodology used by Lockheed Martin. It combines experimentation, technology, and a warfighter's concept of operations to create new tactics and weapons.

See also

 Defense contractor – table of comparable companies
 Lockheed Martin Maintenance Trophy
 Top 100 US Federal Contractors – $38.5 billion in FY09
 Lockheed Martin shooting

References

Further reading
 William D. Hartung. Prophets of War: Lockheed Martin and the Making of the Military-Industrial Complex. Nation Books, 2010. .
 "A Security Analyst Wins Big in Court". Time magazine
 "Lockheed Wins Contract to Build NASA's New Spaceship". Washington Post
 "Jury Slaps Defense Giant for Neglecting National Security". ABC News
 "NASA: Mars Surveyor Was Doomed By Humans". CBS News
 "Lockheed Fined Over Secrets Breach". BBC News
 "Coast Guard Failed to Properly Oversee Contracts, Officials Say". Washington Post
 Ceremonial event planned for final F-22 Raptor

External links 

 

 Lockheed Martin Corporation recipient profile on USAspending.gov
 FAS, history and key dates
 Prepar3D(R): Visual flight simulation software development kit for computers
 Lockheed Martin at SourceWatch
 

Aerospace companies of the United States
Aircraft manufacturers of the United States
American companies established in 1995
Defense companies of the United States
Companies based in Bethesda, Maryland
Companies listed on the New York Stock Exchange
Collier Trophy recipients
Commercial Lunar Payload Services
 
Manufacturing companies based in Maryland
Manufacturing companies established in 1995
Technology companies established in 1995
Unmanned aerial vehicle manufacturers